Dinah is a Hebrew female given name meaning judged or vindicated.

People with the name
 Dinah, a Biblical character
 Dinah Cancer, the stage name of vocalist Mary Simms
 Dinah Christie, Canadian actress
 Dinah Craik, English novelist
 Dinah Jane Hansen, singer from American girl group Fifth Harmony
 Dinah Henson, English amateur golfer
 Dinah Hinz, German actress
 Dinah Lenney, American actress and writer
 Dinah Manoff, American stage and film actress
 Dinah Nuthead, English colonial printer
 Dinah Pfizenmaier, German tennis player
 Dinah Sheridan, English actress 
 Dinah Shore, American singer and actress
 Dinah Shtettin, Yiddish theater actress
 Dinah Washington, American vocalist
 Dinah Hilda Kyomuhimbo, Ugandan research scientist

Fictional characters

 Dinah Marler, a fictional character on the soap opera Guiding Light
 Dinah Morris, a character in George Eliot's novel Adam Bede
 Dinah Lance, the Black Canary in the DC Universe
 Dinah Soar, a fictional superhero in the Marvel Universe
 Dinah the Dachshund, a fictional Disney character 
 Dinah the Dining Car, a character in Starlight Express
 Dinah, Alice's pet cat in Alice's Adventures in Wonderland
 Dinah, a mule belonging to Laurel and Hardy, who appeared in Way out West & The Music Box
 Dinah Macquarie, character in "Seveneves"

See also 
 Deena
 Dena (given name)
 Dina (disambiguation)
 Dinah (disambiguation)